Jim Zylker (born January 11, 1951 in San Francisco, California) is a retired American soccer player who spent two seasons in the North American Soccer League.  He was also a member of the United States soccer team at the 1972 Summer Olympics.

Youth
Zylker grew up in San Francisco, California.  He graduated from South San Francisco High School and first attended Cañada College where he was a two-time community college All-American. He transferred to San Jose State University where he played three seasons (1971-1973) on the men’s soccer team.  He was a 1972 second team All American and holds the school’s single season assists record.  He was inducted into the SJSU Athletic Hall of Fame in 2004.

In 1971, he joined the United States Olympic soccer team as it prepared for the 1972 Olympics.  He played the final United States group game, a 7-0 loss to West Germany.  In 1975, he returned to the Olympic team as it failed to qualify for the 1976 Summer Olympics.  He played seven games in total with the United States Olympic team.

Zykler played for the San Francisco Vikings, a club founded by his grandfather.  In 1975, he signed with the San Jose Earthquakes of the North American Soccer League.  He played fifteen games that season.  He began the 1976 season in San Jose before being traded to the San Antonio Thunder midway through the season.

He has coached the Cañada College women’s soccer team.

References

External links
NASL Stats

1951 births
American soccer players
Association football goalkeepers
Footballers at the 1972 Summer Olympics
North American Soccer League (1968–1984) players
North American Soccer League (1968–1984) indoor players
San Antonio Thunder players
San Jose Earthquakes (1974–1988) players
San Jose State Spartans men's soccer players
Olympic soccer players of the United States
Soccer players from San Francisco
Living people
People from South San Francisco, California
Cañada Colts men's soccer players
Cañada Colts women's soccer coaches